Intiguttu or Inti Guttu (is a Tollywood film that released on 14 September 1984 and was directed by K. Bapayya. This film had Chiranjeevi, Suhasini, Nalini, and Kaikala Satyanarayana in important roles. The movie is remake of 1964 Tamil movie Panakkara Kudumbam.

/ref>

Cast 
 Chiranjeevi
 Nalini
 Suhasini
 Chandramohan
 Rao Gopala Rao
 Giri Babu
 Nutan Prasad
 Satyanarayana
Allu Ramalingaiah
Sarathi
Chalapathi Rao

Soundtrack
 Chedugudu
 Lepave Lepave
 Letha Letha Cheekati
 Navvithe Navvandi
 Randi Podamu
 Veriety Veriety

References

External links
 

1984 films
Films directed by K. Bapayya
Films scored by K. Chakravarthy
1980s Telugu-language films
Telugu remakes of Tamil films